Paarambariyam is a 1993 Indian Tamil language film,  directed by  Manobala and produced by R. Jambunathan. The film stars Sivaji Ganesan, B. Saroja Devi, Pandiyan and Senthil.

Cast 
Sivaji Ganesan as Rajamannar
B. Saroja Devi as Meenakshi
Pandiyan as Sekar
Nirosha as Radha
Chitra as Vimala 
V. K. Ramasamy as Balakrishnan (Rajamannar Friend)
Malaysia Vasudevan as Aandiyappan (Sekar Father)
Vennira Aadai Moorthy as Vadivel
Senthil as Brokkur Kanthasamy
Ganthimathi 
Idichapuli Selvaraj
Periya Karuppu Thevar

Soundtrack
Soundtrack was composed by Sankar Ganesh.
"Ilam Pookkale" - K. S. Chithra
"Rajadhi Raja" - Mano
"Sandhana Kaatru" - Mano, Chithra
"Enga Ooru Rasa" - Mano, Vani Jairam
"Yelapoo" - Vani Jairam
"Simma Kuralukum" - Malaysia Vasudevan, P. Susheela
"Thanga Mugathile" - Vani Jairam

References 

1993 films
1990s Tamil-language films
Films directed by Manobala
Films scored by Shankar–Ganesh